James Hamish Stuart (born 8 October 1949) is a British guitarist, bassist, singer, composer and record producer. He was an original member of the Average White Band.

Biography 
Born in Glasgow, Scotland, Stuart attended Queens Park School in Glasgow and left to form his first professional band 'The Dream Police'.

He recorded a couple of singles with  the Dream Police, before he was invited to join the recently formed Average White Band (AWB) in June 1972.

A member of AWB from 1972 to 1982, he went on to work with Aretha Franklin, Chaka Khan and David Sanborn.

He wrote Atlantic Starr's 1986 hit "If Your Heart Isn't in It" and songs for Smokey Robinson, Jeffrey Osborne, George Benson and Diana Ross.

Stuart joined Paul McCartney’s band (where he switched between guitar and bass as necessary with McCartney) for McCartney's 1989 comeback album, Flowers in the Dirt, and appearing on several other albums and McCartney's world tours of 1989 and 1993.

After collaborating on numerous albums for other artists, he recorded his first solo album, Sooner or Later, in 1999, 17 years after leaving the Average White Band, which he released on his own record label, Sulphuric Records.

Apart from playing with his own group, the Hamish Stuart Band, and with his fellow Glaswegian guitarist and friend Jim Mullen, Stuart has also produced Gordon Haskell and the Swedish singer-songwriter Meja.

In 2006, Stuart toured as the bass player with Ringo Starr & His All-Starr Band. He joined Starr again for a 2008 tour, where he performed "Pick Up The Pieces" and "Work to Do". He once again toured with the band in 2019 playing "Pick Up the Pieces", "Work to Do", and "Cut the Cake". Although the tour paused because of COVID-19 precautions, it resumed in 2022, completing tour dates initially planned for 2020.

In 2007, he produced and appeared as a guest vocalist on the album All About the Music, by The AllStars collective.

In July 2015, Stuart reunited with his AWB bandmates Malcolm "Molly" Duncan and Steve Ferrone to form The 360 Band. This is in essence one third of the original Average White Band. They released an album titled Three Sixty in 2017 and have been performing live together along with supporting musicians.

He is the curator, along with partner Claire Houlihan and friend Tom Sutton-Roberts, of the annual mOare Music festival, held in the village of Oare, Faversham, Kent.

In recognition of his unique contribution to music, in 2016, Stuart was awarded with a BASCA Gold Badge award.

Discography

With Average White Band
1973 Show Your Hand (re-issued in 1975 as Put It Where You Want It)
1974 AWB
1975 Cut the Cake
1976 Soul Searching
1976 Person to Person (live)
1977 AWB/Live at Montreux
1977 Benny & Us
1978 Warmer Communications
1979 Feel No Fret
1979 Shine
1982 Cupid's in Fashion

With Chaka Khan
Chaka (1978)
Naughty (1980)
What Cha' Gonna Do for Me (1981)
Chaka Khan (1982)
I Feel for You (1984)

With Paul McCartney
Flowers in the Dirt (1989)
Tripping the Live Fantastic (1990)
Unplugged (1991)
Off the Ground (1993)
Paul is Live (1993)

With Ringo Starr & His All-Starr Band
 Ringo Starr & His All Starr Band Live 2006 (2008)
 Live at the Greek Theatre 2008 (2010)

Other recordings
 1976 – "A Love of Your Own" – Ned Doheny
 1976 – Up – Dick Morrissey & Jim Mullen
 1977 – The Atlantic Family Live at Montreux
 1984 – Vocalist on the song "Love & Happiness" from the album Straight to the Heart
 1999 – Sooner or Later
 2000 – Jimjam – Jim Mullen
 2017 – Three Sixty – The 360 Band
 2018 – James Brown Is Annie II – James Brown Is Annie

References

External links
Interview at Wholenote Online Guitar Community
Hamish Stuart at Gazetteer for Scotland

1949 births
Living people
Musicians from Glasgow
Musicians from London
Scottish rock guitarists
English rock guitarists
Male bass guitarists
Scottish bass guitarists
Scottish record producers
20th-century Scottish male singers
Scottish songwriters
Scottish session musicians
Scottish expatriates in the United States
Average White Band members
British funk musicians
Ringo Starr & His All-Starr Band members
21st-century Scottish male singers
Paul McCartney Band members